Close Coupled Cooling is a last generation cooling system particularly used in data centers. The goal of close coupled cooling is to bring heat transfer closest to its source: the equipment rack. By moving the air conditioner closer to the equipment rack a more precise delivery of inlet air and a more immediate capture of exhaust air is ensured.

Air Conditioner Types 
Commercially available close coupled solutions can be divided into two categories: Open-Loop and Closed-Loop.

Open-Loop Configuration 

Open-Loop configurations are not totally independent from the room they are installed, and air flows interact with the ambient room environment.

In-Row Air Conditioners 

Row-Based Air Conditioning units are installed inside the rack rows. Air flows generally follow short and linear paths, reducing, in this way, the necessary power needed to start up the fans and increasing the energy efficiency.

A Row-Based cooling solution offers one advantage with respect to the Room-Based solution, since the former one can be better adapted to the needs of cooling for specific rows; it is anyway appropriate not to locate the conditioning units at the beginning or at the end of the rows to maximise their performance.

Rear Door Heat Exchangers 

This type of solution is based on the substitution of the rear door of an existing rack.

These heat exchangers leverage the front-to-back air dissipation of most of the IT equipments: the servers dissipate warm air, which passes the heat exchanger coil and is returned to the room at an agreeable temperature.

The cooling units of this category do not occupy additional space, so they are particularly indicated either to cool all the spaces originally designed as data centers, or to  integrate an already existing cooling system.

Overhead Heat Exchangers 

Generally, a heat exchanger of this type discharges air from the ceiling into the cold aisle whereas the exhaust air rises into the vents in the ceiling; in Close Coupled system cases, the units are positioned directly above the servers, making the cold air delivery and hot air return much more precise.

A system of this type, being positioned vertically, does not need further floor space in the room.

Closed-Loop Configuration 

The Closed-Loop cooling typologies act independently from the room they are installed; the rack and the heat exchanger work exclusively with one another, creating an internal microclimate.

In Rack Cooling 

The cooling system is adjoint to the server rack and both of them are completely sealed; the solid doors on the enclosure and In-Row Air Conditioners contain the air flow, directing cold air to the server inlet and exhaust air, by using fans, through the cooling coil.

The Close-Loop design allows a very focused cooling at rack level and it is possible to install very dense equipment disregarding the ambient environment, giving flexibility to use unconventional spaces to install the IT equipment.

Efficiency 

In the traditional layout, the fans must move air from the perimeter of the room, under the raised floor, and through a perforated floor tile into servers intake. This process requires energy, that varies depending on the typology of the structure. Often, under the raised floor, holdbacks (large cable bundles, conduits) exist, requiring additional fan energy to move the required cold air volume.

Being that in Close Coupled solutions the cooling system and the equipment rack are close to one another, the energy needed is reduced. With an In-Row typology the cooling unit is incorporated in the row of racks and, providing air directly to the row, there are not impediments to consider under the floor. It is estimated, that when integrated, a Close Coupled system can guarantee up to 95% of annual energy reduction compared to a traditional CRAC system of equal cooling capacity.

Some cooling typologies can be associated to fans with variable velocity that adapt in better ways to the workload, so also to the internal temperature of the rack. Having fans that work at the minimum velocity satisfying the requirements of the Data Center is very important for energy consumption.

It is verified that the percentage of energy saved, hence the total energy cost decreases in a more than proportional way with respect to the decrease of air flow (for example, by reducing the fan velocity by 10% we save 27% of energy).

Efficiency is also represented by modularity. With a Close Coupled solution in is indeed possible adding new conditioners in forecast of an increase of the Data Centre capacity.

Despite the fact that some past studies have speculated a very elevated growth of sales of Close Coupled solutions, more recent studies have instead shown a more contained growth. The reason seems to be due to the fact that the In-Row solutions offer significant energy savings as the rack densities are close to the 8-10 kW threshold; today's average densities for medium-sized data centers are instead about 5 kW and energy savings do not fully justify the higher cost of investment for the cooling system.

Refrigerated Water Temperatures 

In traditional systems, the refrigerated water supply temperatures typically vary between 6 and 7 °C and cold water is in fact necessary to generate cold air that compensates for the rise that occurs on the floor of the data center, since the cold inlet air and the hot exhaust air interact. However, it is necessary to ensure that the inlet temperature is between 18 and 26.5 °C as established by the ASHRAE.

Some types of Close Coupled systems allow warmer water inlet temperatures due to the proximity of the refrigeration system and the design of the cooling coil while remaining within the guidelines of the ASHRAE.

Since the refrigerators represent 30-40% of the energy consumption of a data center and that this is largely due to mechanical refrigeration, a higher water inlet temperature allows increase the hours in which free cooling is possible and therefore increase the efficiency of the refrigerator.

Close Coupled system of Google Data Centers 

For several years now, Google, according to the statements of the vice president of Data Centers, Joseph Kava, restructures the cooling system of its Data Centers every 12 – 18 months, also focusing on Close Coupled type systems.

In 2012 Google published a photo gallery that shows the design of its cooling system, followed by an explanation of Data Center Vice President Joseph Kava, of how it works.

In the data center shown the rooms serve as cold corridors, there is a raised floor but there are no perforated tiles. Cooling occurs in closed corridors with rows of racks on both sides while cooling coils using cold water serve as the ceiling of these warm corridors, which also house the pipes that carry the water to and from the cooling towers housed in another part of the building.

The temperature of the air is generally maintained around 26.5 °C, getting warmer more and more due to the contact with various components, up to about 49 °C. When air is directed by fans in the warm closed corridor where, reaching the top of the room passes through the cooling coil and is cooled to room temperature. The flexible piping connects to the cooling coil at the top of the hot aisle and descends through an opening in the floor and flows under the raised floor.

From the statements of Kava  "If we had leaks in the conduits, the water would sink down into our raised floor. We have a lot of experience with this design, and it has never happened a large water loss" , the presence of an emergency system for any water leaks is confirmed. It is also confirmed that the proximity of liquids to the servers is not considered problematic.

Kava also stated, referring to other types of cooling systems with installations on the ceiling to return the hot exhaust air to the air conditioners of the computer room (CRAC) located along the perimeter of the raised floor area, that  The whole system is inefficient because the hot air is moved over a long distance while traveling towards the "CRAC", while a Close Coupled system is significantly more efficient.

 Bibliography 
 Bean, J., & Dunlap, K. (2008), Energy Efficient Data Centers: A Close-coupled Row Solution, ASHRAE Journal , 34-40.
 EPA. (2007, Agosto 2), EPA Report to Congress on Server and Data Center Energy Efficiency, da Energy Star.
 EYP Mission Critical Facilities. (2006, Luglio 26). Energy Intensive Buildings Trends and Solutions: Data Centers , da Critical Facilities Roundtable.
 Fontecchio, M. (2009, Gennaio 21), Data Center Air Conditioning Fans Blow Savings Your Way, da Search Data Center.
Sun Microsystems (2008), Energy Efficient Data Centers: The Role of Modularity in Data Center Design, Sun Microsystems.

 Notes 

 DataCenterKnowledge
 Cabling install
 Close coupled cooling market

 External links 

 How google cools its armada of servers Metrics and efficiency the future of data centers Close coupled cooling market Close-coupled cooling''

Data centers